Marcus Solberg Mathiasen (born 17 February 1995) is a Danish former professional footballer who played as a forward.

Career

Solberg was born in Aarhus, Denmark, and started his career in the youth ranks at HEI in Aarhus, before he was picked up by AGF, where he earned the nickname "Hulk". He played a number of years in the youth and reserve teams for the club, before making his Danish Superliga debut on 4 March 2013, playing the last 6 minutes in an away match against Esbjerg fB.

In May 2015, Solberg signed with Silkeborg IF on a two-year contract. On 15 April 2016, it was announced that Solberg was sent on loan to Fjölnir for the remainder of 2016, and in November 2016, he permanently signed with the club, despite having six months left on his contract with Silkeborg.

In January 2018, Solberg moved to Vendsyssel FF, and helped them secure promotion to the Danish Superliga a few months later. He was loaned out to second-tier club Thisted FC in late January 2019, as he did not have prospects of playing time for Vendsyssel.

On 10 August 2020, at the age of 25, Solberg was forced to announce his retirement due to an injury that had tormented him for two years.

Career statistics

References

External links 
 
 Official Danish Superliga stats 
 

1995 births
Living people
Footballers from Aarhus
Danish men's footballers
Danish expatriate men's footballers
Aarhus Gymnastikforening players
Silkeborg IF players
Vendsyssel FF players
Thisted FC players
Ungmennafélagið Fjölnir players
Danish 1st Division players
Úrvalsdeild karla (football) players
Danish Superliga players
Association football forwards
Danish expatriate sportspeople in Iceland
Expatriate footballers in Iceland